HLA-DR16(DR16) is a HLA-DR serotype that recognizes the DRB1*1601, *1602 and *1604 gene products. DR16 is found in the Mediterranean at modest frequencies. DR16 is part of the older HLA-DR2 serotype group which also contains the similar HLA-DR15 antigens.

Alleles

Disease associations
DR16 is associated with Chaga's cardiomyopathy, rheumatic heart disease, coronary artery ectasia, and chronic discoid lupus erythematosus.

DRB1*1601 is associated with tuberculosis risk

DRB1*1602: Juvenile rheumatoid arthritis, rheumatic heart disease, Takayasu arteritis, systemic sclerosis (SSc) & anti-DNA topoisomerase I (anti-topo I) antibody, melioidosis (Burkholderia pseudomallei infection)

Extended linkage

DRB1*1601:DQA1*0102:DQB1*0502 haplotype is associated with tubeculousis risk 

 *1602:DQA1*0102:DQB1*0502 haplotype: graves disease, cervical cancer (human papilloma virus infection),  scleroderma
 *1602:DQA1*05:DQB1*0301 haplotype: rheumatic heart disease, systemic sclerosis

Genetic Linkage

HLA-DR16 is genetically linked to HLA-DR51 and HLA-DQ5 serotypes.

References

2